Albert Lewis may refer to:

Albert Lewis (American football) (born 1960), American football player
Albert Lewis (producer) (1884–1978), Broadway producer
Albert B. Lewis (1925–2021), New York politician
Albert Gerald Lewis (1918–1982), World War II Royal Air Force pilot
Albert L. Lewis (1917–2008), American rabbi
Albert Buell Lewis (1867–1940), American anthropologist
Albert Lewis (priest) (1921–2008), Welsh Anglican priest
Albert Lewis (footballer) (c. 1884 –?), English footballer
Talbot Lewis (Albert Edward Lewis, 1877–1956), English cricketer and footballer

See also
Al Lewis (disambiguation)
Bert Lewis (disambiguation)